The women's 100 metres at the 1946 European Athletics Championships was held in Oslo, Norway, at Bislett Stadion on 22 August 1946.

Medalists

Results

Final
22 August

Semi-finals
22 August

Semi-final 1

Semi-final 2

Heats
22 August

Heat 1

Heat 2

Heat 3

Heat 4

Participation
According to an unofficial count, 20 athletes from 9 countries participated in the event.

 (2)
 (1)
 (2)
 (3)
 (2)
 (3)
 (1)
 (3)
 (3)

References

100 metres
100 metres at the European Athletics Championships
Euro